ECU Health EastCare is the critical care mobile air and ground transport of ECU Health at ECU Health Medical Center.  It serves 31 counties in Eastern North Carolina.   It is sponsored by ECU Health Medical Center and The Brody School of Medicine at East Carolina University.  ECU Medical Center is the only level 1 trauma center east of Raleigh.  EastCare's five full-time air ambulances constitute the largest air medical program in North Carolina and can serve a radius of  around Greenville without refueling.

Joanna Adams is the current Medical Director for ECU Health EastCare and Trey Labrecque is the Program Director.

ECU Health EastCare can be dispatched for a number of causes, including: trauma, burn, neonatal, high risk pregnancy, hyperbaric medicine, stroke and myocardial infarction.  ECU Health EastCare is most often sent for cardiac patients, followed by trauma, pediatric and neonatal patients.  EastCare boasts an excellent safety record.  It's only major mishap occurred on January 8, 1987.

In January 2012, Vidant Medical Transport changed its name from EastCare as part of a system wide renaming initiative.  In October 2014, Vidant Medical Transport became Vidant EastCare.  In May 2022, Vidant EastCare became ECU Health EastCare.

History
On December 18, 1984, the PCMH Board of Trustees budgeted $754,119 to set up a helicopter ambulance service.  EastCare was established by PCMH on April 8, 1985.  On June 30, 1985, an open house was held to usher in the new ambulance service.

EastCare helped ECU Health Medical Center become a level 1 trauma center in November 1985.  It expanded to critical care ground transport in August 1994.  By 2000, ECU Health Medical Center adds a second helicopter to their fleet.  Also, ECU Health Medical Center began the construction of a new emergency department.  The four-story emergency department has a two-helicopter rooftop landing pad which was complete in November 2003. In 2009, the ground ambulances went on more than 10,000 trips.

Hurricane Floyd

On September 16, 1999, Hurricane Floyd made landfall in North Carolina. Damages in Pitt County alone were estimated at $1.6 billion (1999 USD, $1.87 billion 2006 USD).

ECU Health Medical Center turned into a landing zone for helicopters landing and departing. VMC at the time owned one helicopter.  EastCare flew 102 missions from landfall to ten days later.  The first mission occurred on the afternoon of landfall.  EastCare transported a woman who had been rescued Pinetops from her rooftop who was nearing labor.  The situation far exceeded VMC's aerial capability. Mission St. Joseph's Health System in Asheville sent one helicopter for two days, the STAT MedEvac sent one helicopter and two teams for six days and Rocky Mountain Helicopters / Air Methods, the company that operated EastCare's helicopters at the time, sent one helicopter for two days.  Many military helicopters from the North Carolina Air National Guard were used to help rescue survivors and bring them to the hospital.   At the height of the aftermath there were as many as thirty helicopter missions each day, more than ten times the rate normally.  A few days after the storm hit, the staff was fatigued and was replaced.  It became ECU Health EastCare's job to fly and pick up staff who work at the hospital.  ECU Health EastCare also transported patients and supplies to and from the hospital.

Communications and Dispatch
EastCare's dedicated communications center, callsign "E-Comm," receives, prioritizes, and directs requests for service for both ground and air units.  The communication center is located on the top floor of ECU Medical Center emergency department tower, overlooking the helipad, and is staffed 24/7/365 by specially trained emergency communicators/dispatchers, . Primary communications are via 800 MHz radio utilizing the VIPER network maintained by the North Carolina Department of Public Safety.

Additionally, EastCare's aircrews receive pre-flight and enroute support from a dedicated Operational Control Center provided by the aviation operator, Metro Aviation's .  Connected to the aircraft by real-time satellite voice and data communications, OCC provides complementary flight following, aviation weather forecasting, and maintenance support during all phases of operation.

Helicopter Air Ambulances
ECU Health EastCare maintains five aviation bases in Bertie, Nash, Craven, Wayne, and Onslow counties. Its helicopters may transport patients directly from the scene of an injury or may be used to transfer patients between medical facilities.  The aircraft complete around 3,500 transports per year, with the average one-way flight being 45 minutes. EastCare's total helicopter fleet consists of four Airbus/Eurocopter EC-145 (N485EC, N854EC, N816EC, N918EC) and three EC-135 (N135EC, N640EC, and N641EC).  Individual aircraft are assigned to a primary base but may be rotated based on operational requirements.  Metro Aviation, Inc., based in Shreveport, LA., is the aviation operator and FAA Part 135 certificate holder, providing pilots and maintenance technicians.  Approximately 80% of EastCare's pilots are U.S. military-trained, with extensive combat experience.  All pilots must meet CAMTS standards, requiring qualifications well above the industry average.

 EastCare Air 1 - Based at ECU Health Bertie Hospital, Windsor NC.
 EastCare Air 2 - Based at the Rocky Mount-Wilson Regional Airport (KRWI).
 EastCare Air 3 - Based at Carolina East Medical Center, New Bern NC.
 EastCare Air 4 - Based at Mt. Olive Municipal Airport (W40).
 EastCare Air 5 - Based at Albert J. Ellis airport (KOAJ).

EastCare maintains two spare aircraft and conducts heavy maintenance from a dedicated facility at Washington-Warren Airport (KOCW) in Beaufort County.

Ground transport
ECU Health EastCare began critical care ground transport in 1994.  The ambulances include two neonatal transfer ambulances and ten type-I ambulances.  There are also twenty four ambulances for advanced and basic life support.  The ground transport vehicles are primary stationed either in Greenville or at one of the bases.  The other stations are Bertie County, Duplin County, Nash County, Onslow County and Pitt County.

Facilities

In addition to an upper landing pad on the roof of ECU Medical Center emergency department that is used for patient transfers, EastCare also maintains a full-service heliport on the ECU Health main campus.  Located at  its FAA LID is NC91.  Commonly referred to as the lower pad, the full service aviation facility consists of a 100 x 100 foot main helipad and two smaller parking pads. Hot/cold refuel, maintenance, and crew rest facilities for EastCare aircraft and aircrews are located on site.  EastCare helicopters will commonly drop off their patients and medical crew on the upper pad then transition to the lower pad to await their next call.  Both upper and lower pads are for exclusive use of EastCare-assigned and other authorized air medical aircraft, all other use requires prior permission.  With approximately 9000 yearly operations, the EastCare heliport is one of the busiest civil heliports in the United States.

Awards and recognitions 
In 1993, it was the first program east of the Mississippi River and fifth overall to be accredited by the Commission on Accreditation of Medical Transport Systems. By 1996, it was the first program to be re-accredited and the first to be accredited for critical-care ground transport.  In 2000, it was selected as the Program of the Year by the Association of Air Medical Services.  It received the Helicopter World/Air Ambulance Search and Rescue 2001 Award for its work during Hurricane Floyd.

An EastCare air/ground crew and communications specialist garnered the 2022 MedEvac Transport of the Year Award by the Association of Air Medical Services (AAMS) for their transport the life-saving measures they provided to swimmer following a boating accident. The team, composed of Steve Bonn (pilot), Henry Gerber (EMT), Milando Stancill (EMT), Leigh Ann Creech (communication technician), Jessica Rispoli (flight nurse), and John vonRosenberg (flight paramedic) saved the life of a young athlete who was pulled into a boat propeller by a ski rope.

Safety 
EastCare boasts an impressive safety record, with only a single notable mishap throughout hundreds of thousands of flight hours flown.

On January 8, 1987, EastCare's Bell 206L LongRanger helicopter was dispatched to the Naval Hospital at Camp Lejeune for a pediatric transport.  Following pickup of the patient, the crew reported an in-flight fire via mayday. A United States Marine Corps search and rescue from Air Station New River was launched and discovered the downed aircraft in the Hoffman Forest, near Pollocksville, Jones County at approximately around 9:40 pm.  Pilot Perry L. Reynolds, flight nurses Mike McGinnis and Pam Demaree, and the patient perished in the mishap.

A memorial monument at EastCare's main heliport commemorates the dedication and sacrifice of the crew.

References

External links
EastCare homepage
FAA Registry for Pitt County Memorial

Air ambulance services in the United States
Ambulance services in the United States
Medical and health organizations based in North Carolina